Swainsona lessertiifolia, commonly known as the coast Swainson-pea, is a sprawling, largely coastal, perennial herb in the pea family that is endemic to south-eastern Australia.  It grows to about 50 cm in height, has divided leaves and bears sprays of rich purple pea flowers.  It is found in coastal dune communities.

References

lessertiifolia
Fabales of Australia
Flora of Victoria (Australia)
Flora of Tasmania
Flora of South Australia
Plants described in 1825
Taxa named by Augustin Pyramus de Candolle